Thomas Robertson (28 December 1864 – January 1924) was a Scottish footballer, who played for Cowlairs, Aston Villa, Queen's Park, St Bernard's and Scotland. After retiring as a player, Robertson was a football referee and became president of the Scottish Football League.

See also
List of Scotland national football team captains

References

Sources

External links

London Hearts profile

1864 births
1924 deaths
Date of death missing
Scottish footballers
Scotland international footballers
Association football central defenders
Association football wing halves
Cowlairs F.C. players
Aston Villa F.C. players
Queen's Park F.C. players
St Bernard's F.C. players
Scottish football referees
Scottish Football League